Deirdre is a feminine given name.

Deirdre may also refer to:
 Deirdre, a tragic heroine in Irish mythology, from whom the name originates
 Deirdre (given name), a list of people and fictional characters
 "Deirdre" (song), a song by the Beach Boys
 Deirdre (horse), a Thoroughbred racehorse
 LÉ Deirdre (P20), a ship in the Irish Naval Service

See also
 Dierdre (artist), world fusion artist Dierdre Dubois, former frontwoman of Ekova
 Deidre